Senator Collier may refer to:

John J. Collier (1815–1892), Georgia State Senate
Randolph Collier (1902–1983), California State Senate